Darlingtonia may refer to:

 Darlingtonia, California, in Del Norte County

 Darlingtonia (plant) Torr., a genus in the family Sarraceniaceae with a single (carnivorous) species
 Darlingtonia DC., a synonym of the legume genus Desmanthus Willd.
 Darlingtonia (snake), a genus of snakes in the family Colubridae